Phrictopyga occidentalis is a species of delphacid planthopper in the family Delphacidae. It is found in the Caribbean, Central America, North America, and South America.

References

Further reading

 
 
 

Delphacinae
Articles created by Qbugbot
Insects described in 1926